Senad Saletović (born 1 January 1968) is a Bosnian-Herzegovinian retired football defender.

Club career
After playing in lower-league side Krivaja Zavidovići he moved to FK Bor playing in third level. His good performances there made him a move at the winter-break of the 1990–91 season to the Yugoslav First League side FK Radnički Niš.

References

1968 births
Living people
Association football defenders
Yugoslav footballers
FK Bor players
FK Radnički Niš players
Yugoslav First League players